Auribail is a commune in the Haute-Garonne department in southwestern France.

Geography
The commune is bordered by five other communes: Beaumont-sur-Lèze to the north, Miremont to the east, Lagrâce-Dieu to the southeast, Saint-Sulpice-sur-Lèze to the south, and finally by Montaut to the west.

Population

See also
Communes of the Haute-Garonne department

References

Communes of Haute-Garonne